Chinese Mozambican or Mozambican Chinese may refer to:
China–Mozambique relations
Ethnic Chinese in Mozambique
Mozambicans in China
Multiracial people of Chinese and Mozambican descent